Davide Petrella (born 6 August 1985), also known as Tropico, is an Italian singer-songwriter, composer, and lyricist.

Life and career 

Born in Naples, Petrella started his career as founder and frontman of the band Le Strisce, with whom he recorded three albums. In 2014, he collaborated with Cesare Cremonini on the album Logico, and since then he became one of the most requested songwriters in Italy. Artists with whom he collaborated include Gianna Nannini, Elisa, Marracash, Jovanotti, Elodie, Mahmood, Sophie and the Giants, Giusy Ferreri, Emma Marrone, Alessandra Amoroso, Fabri Fibra, Achille Lauro, The Kolors, Fedez, J-Ax, Fred De Palma and Anitta.

At the 73rd edition of the Sanremo Music Festival two songs co-written by Petrella, Marco Mengoni's "Due vite" and Lazza's "Cenere", took the lead in the final ranking, respectively in first and second place; together with Mogol, Alberto Testa, Franco Migliacci, Cristiano Minellono and Zucchero Fornaciari, he is one of the few songwriters to hold this record.

Beyond his career as a songwriter for other artists, Petrella is also active as a singer-songwriter under the stage name Tropico.

Discography
Studio albums 
     2018 – Litigare
     2021 – Non esiste amore a Napoli

References

External links   

 

1985 births  
Living people  
People from Naples
Italian singer-songwriters
Italian composers
Italian lyricists